Jim Eley (5 November 1932 – 28 September 2014) was an  Australian rules footballer who played with St Kilda in the Victorian Football League (VFL).

Notes

External links 

1932 births
2014 deaths
Australian rules footballers from Victoria (Australia)
St Kilda Football Club players